Snowmass Village is a home rule municipality in Pitkin County, Colorado, United States.  The population was 2,826 at the 2010 census. A popular winter resort location for skiing and snowboarding, the town is well known as the location of the Snowmass ski area, the largest of the four nearby ski areas operated collectively as Aspen/Snowmass. In 2010, the accidental discovery by a bulldozer operator of fossilized elements of a Pleistocene ecosystem in the ice age lake bed at the Ziegler Reservoir (commonly referred to as the Snowmastodon site) put Snowmass Village prominently on the paleontological map of North America.

Geography
Snowmass Village is located at  (39.214104, -106.945288).

Snowmass Village is to the north and at the base of the Snowmass Ski Area. It is located on Brush Creek, not Snowmass Creek. Within the area of the town, Owl Creek and Brush Creek join and then flow north into the Roaring Fork River.
Visible from the village from east to west are Burnt Mountain Ridge, Burnt Mountain, Baldy Mountain, Chapel Peak, Garret Peak, Clark Peak, Mount Daly, and Capitol Peak. Neither Snowmass Mountain nor Snowmass Peak, at the headwaters of Snowmass Creek, are visible from Snowmass Village.

The geologic unit Mancos Shale underlies most of the area. On slopes too steep for vegetation, this shale is visible as gray expanses of eroding bedrock. On south-facing slopes, the alkaline soil that develops from the shales supports Gambel oak, sagebrush, serviceberry, and chokecherry. The north-facing slopes feature aspen, subalpine fir, Douglas fir, Engelmann spruce, and blue spruce.

The area around Snowmass Village has abundant wildlife including black bears which feed on the acorns and berries of the south-facing slopes.

History
The Brush Creek Valley was settled circa 1910 by ranching families including: Sinclair, Melton, Stapleton, and Hoaglund. As a child, Hilder Hoaglund would ride her horse into Aspen to go to school. Her father, Charles Hoaglund, immigrated from Sweden in the 1800s. After a school was built in Brush Creek valley, she attended the Brush Creek Frontier School, now called the Little Red Schoolhouse, located on Owl Creek Road. She became a teacher at that school and then at the Red Brick School in Aspen. At the schoolhouse, she played the accordion or piano for community dances. When she married Bill Anderson, the Hoaglund Ranch became the Anderson Ranch.

Paul Soldner, a ceramic artist noted for developing American Raku, established a studio in the Anderson Ranch buildings in 1966. He founded the Anderson Ranch Arts Center and it incorporated it into a non-profit in 1973. The Anderson Ranch Art Center on Owl Creek Road uses many of the original buildings from the Hoaglund Ranch, although not in their original location, farther down stream on what is now Snowmass Club Circle.

Under the leadership of Bill Janss and DRC Brown, the American Cement Company developed Snowmass Village as a ski resort starting in 1966. * Hayfields were subdivided and the lots sold for houses. Brush Creek is an unappealing name for a ski area, so they named the resort Snowmass after the valley to the west of Brush Creek. Fritz Benidict acted as the architect of the Snowmass ski area.  The Campground Chairlift serving the western edge of the ski area, actually does extend into the Snowmass Valley. Five chairlifts were installed: Fanny Hill, Burlingame, and Sam's Knob, the Big Burn, and Campground.

The Snowmass ski area first opened on December 16, 1967. The new ski area hired Olympic medalist Stein Eriksen to direct the ski school. Besides experience as a skier and instructor, Stein Eriksen brought an aura of European glamor to the raw new resort.

Brush Creek Road was paved in 1968. The former hayfields still had mostly alfalfa into the 1970s. The Snowmass Golf Course was first laid out with nine holes in (need date). It was expanded and redesigned several times (need dates), the latest in 2001 by James Engh. The periodic re-landscaping of the golf course led to the relocation of ranch houses and to changes in the valley floor from flat or sloping fields to rolling hills with ponds.

The Snowmass Wildcat Fire Protection District was founded in 1971 and the firehouse built on Owl Creek Road.

Notorious serial killer Ted Bundy abducted and murdered Caryn Campbell in Snowmass Village on January 12, 1975. Her body was later found along the Owl Creek road near what is now the Facilities Maintenance Division.

In 1977, the community incorporated as the Town of Snowmass Village.

The Snowmass Chapel was built near the firehouse on Owl Creek Road in 1988. Previous to this time, church services were held in the Octagon Movie Theater or in the open air Aspen Grove Chapel, where benches were set up under aspen trees separating two ski runs. Later the area was cleared for more condominiums off Wood Road.

Today, Snowmass Village has experienced a building boom, as new condominiums, luxury homes, mountainside mansions, and Base Village have recently been constructed. Westin Hotels and the Viceroy Hotel Group have recently built a respective hotel in Snowmass. Snowmass Village is also experiencing a rising influx of wealthy tourists and skiers.

Demographics

As of the census of 2000, there were 1,822 people, 864 households, and 393 families residing in the town. The racial makeup of the town was 97.37% White, 0.16% African American, 0.05% Native American, 0.71% Asian, 0.66% from other races, and 1.04% from two or more races. Hispanic or Latino of any race were 2.63% of the population.

There were 864 households, out of which 19.7% had children under the age of 18 living with them, 41.1% were married couples living together, 2.7% had a female householder with no husband present, and 54.4% were non-families. 36.0% of all households were made up of individuals, and 2.8% had someone living alone who was 65 years of age or older.  The average household size was 2.09 and the average family size was 2.74.

In the town, the population was spread out, with 15.8% under the age of 18, 7.6% from 18 to 24, 41.6% from 25 to 44, 28.7% from 45 to 64, and 6.3% who were 65 years of age or older.  The median age was 37 years. For every 100 females, there were 128.6 males.  For every 100 females age 18 and over, there were 132.4 males.

The median income for a household in the town was $57,059, and the median income for a family was $86,338. Males had a median income of $40,625 versus $37,500 for females. The per capita income for the town was $35,224.  About 1.7% of families and 4.4% of the population were below the poverty line, including 1.5% of those under age 18 and none of those age 65 or over.

Real estate
Snowmass Village's real estate, as Aspen's, is much more expensive than the US average. Single family homes are rarely available under $2 million. In the second half of 2020, the average single family home in Snowmass Village sold for $4 million, compared to $11 million in Aspen. The average condo/townhouse in Snowmass Village, many of which are ski-in/ski-out, sold for nearly $1.5 million.

See also

Snowmass Ski Area
Snowmastodon site

References

External links
Snowmass Tourism website
Town of Snowmass Village website
CDOT map of the Town of Snowmass Village
Snowmass-Wildcat Fire Protection District

Towns in Pitkin County, Colorado
Towns in Colorado
Roaring Fork Valley